The 2003 North Dakota State Bison football team was an American football team that represented North Dakota State University during the 2003 NCAA Division II football season as a member of the North Central Conference. In their first year under head coach Craig Bohl, the team compiled an 8–3 record.

Schedule

References

North Dakota State
North Dakota State Bison football seasons
North Dakota State Bison football